Allen Wastler is a digital content executive in the financial services industry and a former financial journalist and TV personality. He currently oversees digital content in the insurance industry.

Background
Allen Wastler was managing editor on CNBC.com from August 2007 through September 2015. In addition to managing the website and writing an online column, he made regular appearances on the network, commenting on various internet-related developments and news items.

During his time at CNBC, he also served  on the board of governors  of the Society of American Business Editors and Writers.

Wastler had been Managing Editor of CNNMoney.com since August 1999. He joined  CNNfn.com in May 1997 as a producer and became supervising producer later.  Before that he wrote for the Journal of Commerce, a daily business newspaper owned by the Economist.

Wastler ran the New York City newsroom and appeared regularly on CNNMoney Morning. He wrote an online column, Wastler's Wanderings, which touched on both business and personal finance issues, and was one of money.cnn.com's most popular.

Education
Wastler has a bachelor's degree in writing from Johns Hopkins University and a master's in business from the University of San Francisco.

References

External links
cnbc.com
benzinga.com (interview)

Johns Hopkins University alumni
University of San Francisco alumni
CNN people
American television producers
American editors
CNBC people
Living people
Date of birth missing (living people)
20th-century births
Year of birth missing (living people)